Spodnji Boč is a dispersed settlement in the hills above Selnica ob Dravi in northeastern Slovenia.

References

External links
Spodnji Boč on Geopedia

Populated places in the Municipality of Selnica ob Dravi